Corrigan Lake is a lake in Kenora District in northwestern Ontario, Canada. It is in the Hudson Bay drainage basin, and lies in the geographic townships of Pelican and Umbach.

There are no inflows. The major outflow, at the east, is an unnamed creek to Culloden Lake, which flows via Culloden Creek, the Winnipeg River and the Nelson River to Hudson Bay.

See also
List of lakes in Ontario

References

Other map sources:

Lakes of Kenora District